Labour corps or labor corps usually refers to an organisation that provides labour for military-related purposes. It may be a civilian auxiliary or an internal branch (i.e. an administrative corps or mustering) of a particular military service.

Members of labour corps often perform unskilled manual labour in fields such as construction, military engineering, or logistics (especially transport).

References

Non-combatant military personnel
Auxiliary military units
Corps
Military terminology